Pasquale Carminucci (29 August 1937 – 22 February 2015) was an Italian gymnast. He was the brother of Giovanni Carminucci and participated in three editions of the Summer Olympics, 1960, 1964 and 1968.

Biography
Carminucci was born in San Benedetto del Tronto. He won the bronze medal in all-around with the Italian national team at the 1960 Summer Olympics.

References

External links

Pasquale Carminucci's obituary 

1937 births
2015 deaths
Italian male artistic gymnasts
Gymnasts at the 1960 Summer Olympics
Gymnasts at the 1964 Summer Olympics
Gymnasts at the 1968 Summer Olympics
Olympic gymnasts of Italy
Olympic bronze medalists for Italy
Olympic medalists in gymnastics
Medalists at the 1960 Summer Olympics